Sigel may refer to:

Surname
Franz Sigel (1824–1902), Union general in the American Civil War
Elsie Sigel (d. 1909), murder victim, granddaughter of Franz Sigel
Jay Sigel (b. 1943), American professional golfer
Mike Sigel (b. 1952), American professional fantasy baseball player
Beanie Sigel (b. 1974), pseudonym of rapper Dwight Howard

Places
Sigel, Illinois 
Sigel, Chippewa County, Wisconsin 
Sigel, Wood County, Wisconsin 
Sigel Township, Shelby County, Illinois
Sigel Township, Michigan
Sigel Township, Minnesota

Other
 Sigel, the Old English for "Sun", see Sól (Germanic mythology) 
Sowilo rune or Sigel rune
A magic sign, see Sigil
Sigel (Oh My Goddess!), a character in the manga series Oh My Goddess!

See also
Chagall (disambiguation)
Siegel
Segal
Segel
Sigil (disambiguation)